Taransay is a 39-meter luxury motor yacht built by the Italian shipyard Rossinavi. Delivered in 2015, Taransay is a modern equipped replica of an already existent yacht, having the same name and dated 1930.
Taransay features exterior styling by the Rossinavi in-house team in collaboration with STB Italia and an interior designed by Tassin Design company.

The name Taransay is inspired by the Scottish island in the Outer Hebrides.

History 
Taransay construction started in 2013 when the German owner, in possession of the project of an old motor yacht dated 1929, decided to reproduce it using the modern technologies. Launched by the builder shipyard Rossinavi, in Viareggio in April 2015, Taransay left for its first cruise just two months after.

In September, Taransay successfully participated to the Monaco Yacht Show 2015, where received the prestigious Monaco Award for its originality and distinction.

This yacht was originally designed by GL Watson and completely redesigned by Tassin Design company.

General characteristics 
Taransay'''s interior configuration has been designed to comfortably accommodate up to 10 guests overnight in 5 cabins, comprising a master suite, 1 double cabin and 3 twin cabins. She is also capable of carrying up to 7 crew on board to ensure a relaxed luxury yacht experience.
Powered by 2 Caterpillar (C18 Acert) 803 hp diesel engines and propelled by her twin screw propellers motor yacht Taransay'' is capable of a top speed of 14 knots, and comfortably cruises at 12 knots.

Awards 
 Monaco Yacht Show Monaco Award 2015
 RINA Green Plus 2015
 ISS Design and Leadership Awards Best yacht between 24 and 40 m Winner Taransay

References

External links 
Rossinavi Official Web Site
Taransay Video on YouTube

2015 ships
Individual yachts
Replica ships
Ships of Malta
Ships built in Italy